Edward St Aubyn (born 14 January 1960) is an English author and journalist. He is the author of ten novels, including notably the semi-autobiographical Patrick Melrose novels. In 2006, Mother's Milk was shortlisted for the Booker Prize.

Personal background and education
St Aubyn was born in 1960 in London, the son of Roger Geoffrey St Aubyn (1906–1985), a surgeon, and his second wife, Lorna Mackintosh (1929–2005). On his father's side, he is a great-great grandson of Sir Edward St Aubyn, 1st Baronet, and a great-nephew of John St Aubyn, 1st Baron St Levan. On his mother's side, he is a grandson of Captain Alastair William Mackintosh of the Seaforth Highlanders, who was briefly married to Constance Talmadge 1926–1927), and Lela Emery (later Duchess of Talleyrand), daughter of the American businessman John Josiah Emery, Sr. He is a great-nephew of John J. Emery, Jr. and Audrey Emery, wife of Grand Duke Dmitri Pavlovich of Russia.

St Aubyn’s father was first married to Sophie Helene Freifrau von Puthon of Schloss Mirabell in Salzburg, whom he divorced in 1957. St Aubyn has two half-sisters by his father's first marriage, and an elder sister, Alexandra. He grew up in London and France, where his family had houses. He has described an unhappy childhood in which he was repeatedly raped by his sexually abusive father from the ages of 5 to 8, with the complicity of his mother.

St Aubyn attended Sussex House and then Westminster School. In 1979 he went on to read English at Keble College, Oxford. At the time a heroin addict, he graduated with a pass, the lowest possible class of degree. He entered psychotherapy at the age of 25 and subsequently became a professional writer.

From 1987 to 1990, St Aubyn was married to the author Nicola Shulman, now Marchioness of Normanby. He has a son, Lucian, by Jane Longman, daughter of Lady Elizabeth Longman and Mark Longman, and a daughter, Eleanor St Aubyn, by another previous relationship. He lives in London.

Patrick Melrose series

Five of St Aubyn's novels, Never Mind, Bad News, Some Hope, Mother's Milk, and At Last, form The Patrick Melrose Novels, the first four of which were republished in a single volume in 2012, in anticipation of the fifth. They are based on the author's own life; the titular protagonist grows up in a highly dysfunctional upper-class English family, and deals with his father's sexual abuse, the deaths of both parents, alcoholism, heroin addiction and recovery, and marriage and parenthood.

The books have been hailed as a powerful exploration of how emotional health can be carved out of childhood trauma.

Mother's Milk was made into a feature film released in 2011. The screenplay was written by St Aubyn and director Gerald Fox. It stars Jack Davenport, Adrian Dunbar, Diana Quick, and Margaret Tyzack in her last performance.

In 2018 a five-part television series, Patrick Melrose was broadcast, a joint production of Showtime and Sky Atlantic. Benedict Cumberbatch stars as Patrick Melrose (with the young Patrick played by Sebastian Maltz), with each episode based on a different novel in the series. The series premiered on Showtime on 12 May 2018 to favourable reviews.

Awards and honours
1992 Betty Trask Award winner for Never Mind
1998 Guardian Fiction Prize shortlisted for On the Edge
2006 Man Booker Prize shortlisted for Mother's Milk
2007 Prix Femina Etranger winner for Mother's Milk
2007 South Bank Show award on literature winner for Mother's Milk
2014 Bollinger Everyman Wodehouse Prize winner for Lost for Words

Works

Double Blind. Harvill Secker. 2021.

References

Further reading

External links

Guardian interview
The Independent article
"Edward St Aubyn and the enigma of consciousness" (Telegraph)
 Biography from the Berlin International Literature Festival

1960 births
Living people
Alumni of Keble College, Oxford
People educated at Westminster School, London
Prix Femina Étranger winners
20th-century British novelists
21st-century British novelists
English people of American descent
English people of Scottish descent
British male novelists
Fellows of the Royal Society of Literature
20th-century British male writers
21st-century British male writers
People educated at Sussex House School